Marie Cathrine Preisler née Devegge (1761–1797), was a Danish stage actress. 

She was active at the Royal Danish Theatre in 1778-97, and a member of the Det Dramatiske Selskab in 1777-79.  She is counted as among the elite of her profession, enjoyed great popularity and was famed for her heroine Soubrette roles.  

She married Joachim Daniel Preisler in 1779. This attracted great attention at the time because he was a member of the upper class and moreover joined her profession after their marriage, highly unusual in an age when the stage professions were of low social status.  Her spouse became an appreciated actor in lover roles, but the couple made a scandal with their spendthrift: in 1792, her husband fled the country, and four years later, she was placed under guardianship in order to sort out her financial affairs.

Roles
Roles at the Royal Danish Theatre:

1770s
 1778	Crispin sin herres rival	Angelique
 1778	De tre friere	Lucilia
 1778	Deucalion og Pyrrha	Pyrrha
 1778	Don Ranudo de Colibrados	Donna Maria
 1778	Lykken bedre end forstanden	Julie
 1778	Sammensyeren	Chloe
 1778	Ulysses von Ithacia	Rosimunda, Helenes søster
 1778	Zarine	Nitocre
 1779	Celinde	Celinde
 1779	Crispin sin herres rival	Angelique
 1779	Den dobbelte prøve	Philaminte, ung enke
 1779	Den indbildt syge	Angelique
 1779	Forøderen	Belise, Cleons gode ven
 1779	Hekseri	Terentia, Leanders fæstemø
 1779	Jean de France	Elsebeth, Jeronimus's datter
 1779	Raptussen	Jenny
 1779	Rosenbruden i Salency	Lucile
 1779	Uden hoved og hale	Kærling
 1780	Den kærlige kone	Baronesse Lucilia
 1780	Den sansesløse	Clarice
 1780	Den vægelsindede	Helene, Erastes søster
 1780	Husfaderen og stifmoderen	Lucretia

1780s
 80	Mændenes skole as Leonore
 1780	Vildmanden as Frøkenen af Kerkabon
 1781	Aglae	Aglae as * 1781	Den skjønne Arsene	Eugenia
 1781	Bondepigen ved hoffet as Emilie, grevinde
 1781	De forliebte haandværksfolk as Madame Constance
 1781	De Forliebtes galenskaber as Agathe
 1781	Den fornuftige daare as Thrine
 1781	Den nysgerrige as Mad. Stændler
 1781	Jeppe paa bjærget	Ridefogdens as kone
 1781	Kongen og forpagteren as Jenny
 1781	Kærlighed paa prøve as Lucilia, Leonoras kusine
 1781	Soliman den anden as Roxelane, fransk slavinde
 1782	Bondepigen ved hoffet as Ninette, bondepige
 1782	Cecilia as Lisbeth, bondepige
 1782	De aftakkede officerer as Frøken Goschenborn
 1782	De fortrædelige hændelser as sConstance
 1782	De tre friere as Julie
 1782	Den forstilte tvistighed as Lotte
 1782	Den gerrige as Elise
 1782	Den gifte filosof as Celiante
 1782	Den stolte as Isabelle, Lisimons datter
 1782	Det standsede bryllup as Julie, ung enke
 1782	Emilie Galotti as Grevinde Orsina
 1782	Florentineren as Leonore
 1782	Henrik og Pernille as Leonore
 1782	Kolonien as Marine, ung gartnerinde
 1782	Kun seks retter as Fru Reinhard
 1782	Landsbypigen as Lise
 1782	Skovbyggeren as Pauline
 1782	Soliman den anden as Roxelane, fransk slavinde
 1782	Turcaret as Baronessen, ung enke
 1783	Beverley as Henriette, Beverleys søster
 1783	De aftakkede officerer as Frøken Goschenborn
 1783	Den straffede gjæk as Fru Clorinville
 1783	Det uventede møde as Amine,  Rezias opvartersker
 1783	Hververne as Melinde, rig frøken
 1783	Hyrdinden paa Alperne as Jeanette, bondepige
 1783	Julie as Cateau
 1783	Købmanden i Smyrna as Amalie, Dorvals forlovede brud
 1783	Soldaten som kan hekse as Lisette, Argantes pige
 1783	Søofficererne as Fru Spencer, Kings søster
 1783	Søofficererne as Grevinde Worthington
 1783	Vennen af huset as Agathe
 1783	Væddeløbet as Grevinde Semange
 1784	Aglae as Aglae
 1784	Bagtalelsens skole as Lady Teazle
 1784	Barberen i Sevilla as Rosine, Bartholos myndling
 1784	Barselstuen as Kone
 1784	Bødkeren as Trine
 1784	De samnitiske ægteskaber as Eliane
 1784	De to venner as Pauline
 1784	De uventede tilfælde as Lisette, Emilies pige
 1784	Den indbildt as syge	Angelique
 1784	Den kærlige forbitrelse as Ascanius
 1784	Det foregivne hekseri as Sigøjner
 1784	Søhavnen as Sangerinde
 1784	Ægteskabsdjævelen as Fru Glosing
 1785	Anton og Antonnette as Antonnette
 1785	Bagtalelsens skole as Lady Teazle
 1785	Barberen i Sevilla as Rosine, Bartolos myndling
 1785	Datum in blanco as Leonore
 1785	De nysgerrige mandfolk as Fru Lisidor
 1785	De nysgerrige mandfolk as Fru Monreal
 1785	Den foregivne Lord as Finette
 1785	Den politiske kandestøber as Mad. Abrahams
 1785	Det foregivne hekseri as Sigøjner
 1785	Fejltagelserne as Frøken Trine
 1785	Gorm den gamle as Gunild,
 1785	Juliane von Lindorak as Henriette von Lindorak
 1785	Kærlighed uden strømper as Grethe, Johans forlovede
 1785	Købmanden i Smyrna as Amalie, Dorvals forlovede brud
 1786	Aglae as Aglae
 1786	Den løgnagtige tjener as Melisse
 1786	Figaros giftermaal as Suzanne, grevindens kammerpige
 1786	Italienerinden i London as Celinde
 1786	Orfevs og Evrydice as Hersilia
 1786	Vestindianeren as Charlotte Rusport
 1787	Ariadne paa Naxos as Ariadne
 1787	Bagtalelsens skole as Lady Teazle
 1787	Balders død as Nanna
 1787	Barberen i Sevilla as Rosine, Bartholos myndling
 1787	Barselstuen as Stine Isenkræmmers / Kone
 1787	Bødkeren as Trine
 1787	Claudina af Villa as Bella	Donna Claudina
 1787	De aftakkede officerer as Frøken Goschenborn
 1787	Den bogstavelige udtydning as Jenny
 1787	Fiskerne as Birthe
 1787	Kvaternen as Lise
 1787	Raptussen as Jenny
 1787	Søofficererne as Fru Spencer, Kings søster
 1788	Bagtalelsens skole as Lady Teazle
 1788	Barberen i Sevilla as Rosine, Bartholos myndling
 1788	Barselstuen as Kone
 1788	Bussemanden as Frøken Munterholm
 1788	Den politiske kandestøber as Mad. Abrahams
 1788	Det foregivne hekseri as Sigøjner
 1788	Forvandlingerne as Marie, en forklædt bondepige
 1788	Heckingborn as Miss Harriet, Datons søster
 1788	Jægerne as Frederikke
 1788	Kærlighed uden strømper as Grethe, Johans forlovede
 1788	Ulysses von Ithacia as Rosimunda, Helenes søster
 1788	Ægteskabsdjævelen as Fru Glosing
 1789	Apothekeren og doktoren as Rosalia
 1789	Ariadne paa Naxos as Ariadne
 1789	Bagtalelsens skole as Lady Teazle
 1789	Den gerrige as Elise
 1789	Den skinsyge kone	Mistress as Oakly
 1789	Den skjønne Arsene as Arsene
 1789	Greven af Olsbach as Julie, grevens søster
 1789	Henrik og Pernille as Leonore
 1789	Ringen as Baronesse von Schønhelm
 1790	Ariadne paa Naxos as Ariadne

1790s
 1790	Athalia as Athalia, dronning
 1790	Damon og Pythias as Thesta, hans søster
 1790	Datum in blanco as Leonore
 1790	De aftakkede officerer as Frøken Goschenborn
 1790	Den indbildt syge as Angelique
 1790	Frode og Fingal as Ulvilda, Kong Frodes søster
 1790	Julie as Grevinde
 1790	Kun seks retter as Fru Reinhard
 1790	Medea as Medea
 1790	Menneskehad og anger as Grevinde
 1790	Mændenes skole as Leonore
 1790	Selim og Mirza as Ung marrokaner
 1790	Søofficererne as Grevinde Worthington
 1791	Ariadne paa Naxos as Ariadne
 1791	Bagtalelsens skole as Lady Teazle
 1791	Balders død as Nanna
 1791	Den naturlige søn as Fru Paragon
 1791	Raptussen as Jenny
 1791	Skuespillerskolen as Frøken von Lemmel
1791	Syngesygen as Lisette
 1792	Arven i Marseille as Madame Saintonge
 1792	Bagtalelsens skole as Lady Teazle
 1792	Barberen i Sevilla as Rosine, Bartholos myndling
 1792	Barselstuen as Kone
 1792	Bortførelsen as Vilhelmine von Sachau
 1792	De vonner og vanner as Frøken von Sommer
 1792	Den sorte mand as Mistress Johnson
 1792	Feen Ursel as Generaladvokat
 1792	Kinafarerne as Birgitte, kælderpige
 1792	Ringen as Majorinde
 1792	Stregen i regningen as Charlotte
 1793	Bagtalelsens skole as Lady Teazle
 1793	Barberen i Sevilla as Rosine, Bartholos myndling
 1793	Barselstuen as Kone
 1793	De to hatte as Fru von Mørbak
 1793	Den mistænkelige mand as Clarinde
 1793	Den aabne brevveksling as Sophie
 1793	Ja eller Nej as Julie
 1793	Ulysses von Ithacia as Rosimunda, Helenes søster
 1794	Han blander sig i alt as Eveline
 1794	Hekseri as Frue
 1794	Kun seks retter as Fru von Schmerling
 1794	Myndlingernes skole as Julie
 1794	Vejen til ødelæggelse as Fru Warren
 1795	Bagtalelsens skole as Lady Teazle
 1795	Bryllupshøjtiden as Generalinde Reichenau
 1795	De aftakkede officerer as Frøken Goschenborn
 1795	De fire Formyndere as Betty
 1795	De nysgerrige fruentimmere as Leonore
 1795	Den værdige kone as Frøken Rauning
 1796	Ariadne paa Naxos as Ariadne
 1796	Bortførelsen as Vilhelmine von Sachau
 1796	Bryllupshøjtiden as Generalinde Reichenau
 1796	De snorrige fættere as Fru Dormin, enke
 1796	Den lykkelige familie as Lovise
 1796	Den aabne brevveksling as Sophie
 1796	Dormon og Wilhelmine as Fru Krumdorf, officersfrue
 1796	Dyveke as Sigbrit
 1796	Rejsen til byen as Fru Reising
 1796	Søofficererne as Fru Spencer, Kings søster
 1797	Barselstuen as Dame
 1797	De forliebte haandværksfolk as Madame Constance
 1797	Han blander sig i alt asEveline
 1797	Stregen i regningen as Charlotte

References

External links
 Dansk Kvindebiografisk Leksikon

1761 births
1797 deaths
18th-century Danish actresses
Danish stage actresses